Tourism in the Turks and Caicos Islands is an industry that generates more than 1 million tourist arrivals per year, and is "the main source of revenue for the country. The tourism industry began in the 1980s, with the opening of Club Med Turquoise, the country's first main resort." "Tourism has benefited from the proximity to the United States and the stability via being a British Overseas Territory. The opening of a cruise port on Grand Turk in 2006 resulted in a significant increase in tourism arrivals to the country."

Cultural and heritage tourism
Cockburn Town in Grand Turk was founded in 1681 by Bermudian salt collectors. This has resulted in a British colonial heritage which continues to this day.

Major historical sites
 Grand Turk Lighthouse
 Wade's Green Plantation
 Cheshire Hall plantation
 Haulover Plantation

Ecotourism

The Caicos Banks, which lie south of the chain of Caicos Islands, is a unique destination for many types of watersports, such as kiteboarding and Standup paddleboarding. A number of wetlands throughout the islands are protected under the Ramsar Convention. Providenciales is home to several national parks, including the Northwest Point National Park and the Pigeon Pond and Frenchman’s Creek Nature Reserve, which is home to the endangered West Indian whistling duck.

Tourism promotion
Tourism promotion is handled through government grants to private businesses, direct marketing by large chain resorts, and organizations such as Visit Turks and Caicos Islands. interCaribbean Airways (formerly Air Turks and Caicos) is an important source of regional visitor traffic as there is a lack of regional airlift into the country. Expansion of the Providenciales International Airport was completed in 2015 in efforts to encourage more trans-Atlantic flights to the country.

References

 
Turks